In mathematics, particularly in algebraic topology, a taut pair is a topological pair whose direct limit of cohomology module of open neighborhood of that pair which is directed downward by inclusion is isomorphic to the cohomology module of original pair.

Definition

Hence its cohomology module  is a direct system where  is a module over a ring with unity. If we denote its direct limit by

the restriction maps  define a natural homomorphism .

Basic properties

Properties related to cohomology theory
 A closed subspace of a paracompactt Hausdorff space is a taut subspace of relative to the Alexander cohomology theory

Note
Since the Čech cohomology and the Alexander-Spanier cohomology are naturally isomorphic on the category of all topological pairs, all of the above properties are valid for Čech cohomology. However, it's not true for singular cohomology (see Example)

Dependence of cohomology theory

Example

See also
Alexander-Spanier cohomology
Čech cohomology

References 

Algebraic topology